Scoparia carvalhoi is a species of moth in the family Crambidae. It is found on the Azores.

References

Moths described in 1998
Scopariinae